Monsef Zerka (born 30 August 1981) is a former professional footballer. He originally played as a striker, but throughout his career he has also played as a fullback and as a midfielder. Born in France, he represented Morocco at international level.

Club career

Nancy
Zerka was born in Orléans. After playing for US Orléans as a youngster, Zerka was signed by Nancy on the recommendation of his coach Jacques Quéré. He completed the final years of his apprenticeship at Nancy before making his debut in 2001. He debuted in a 4–0 home win against Caen, coming in as a late substitute in the 83rd minute.

Before finally signing professional forms (initially a three-year contract) with Nancy in August 2002, Zerka had made his debut for the Morocco national team.

After playing in various positions over the years, Zerka proved effective in a forward role in Nancy's first season back in the top flight, scoring 6 goals in 24 appearances and continued in this position in 2006–07. He left AS Nancy in the summer of 2009, after playing 173 league matches for the club and scoring 17 goals. In Ligue 1, he featured in 85 matches and scored 13 goals.

Zerka will be remember by AS Nancy supporters for scoring the first goal of Nancy in the Final of the 2006 Coupe de la Ligue. It was the first major trophy won by the club since the 1978 French Cup.

Nantes
On 31 August 2010, Zerka signed for Ligue 2 outfit FC Nantes. Zerka debuted for his new in a 2–1 home win against Racing Strasbourg. He also scored his first goal for Nantes in his debut. It was the 1–1 equalizer, scored in the 22nd minute of the match after an assist by Jean-Claude Darcheville. He scored his second, and last, league goal for Nantes in the next match against SC Bastia. It was scored in the 7th minute of the match and it was the opening goal, in a match that ended as a 1–1 draw. It was scored after an assist by Djamel Abdoun. In the next season Zerka remained goalless for Nantes in the league. He scored his only goal that season, in a French Cup 4–2 away defeat by US Boulogne. On 7 January 2011, Nantes and Zerka mutually agreed to part ways. During his spell at Nantes Zerka featured in 35 Ligue 2 games, scoring 2 goals.

Iraklis
On 14 January 2011, Zerka signed a contract with Greek Superleague club Iraklis until the summer of 2012. He debuted for Iraklis on 23 January 2011, as he was in the starting line-up in a 3–0 away defeat by AO Kavala.

New England Revolution
Zerka left Iraklis on a mutual agreement after their relegation from the Greek top flight, and he subsequently signed with Major League Soccer club New England Revolution on 18 August 2011.

Petrolul Ploieşti
In March 2012, he signed with the Romanian club Petrolul Ploieşti, scoring 2 goals in 12 matches.

Tanjong Pagar United
Zerka joined Singapore League (S.League) club Tanjong Pagar United in January 2013. He made his league debut on 22 February 2013 against Balestier Khalsa, scoring a goal in the match that ended 3–1 to Tanjong Pagar United. On 27 February 2013, in only his second league match, Zerka scored his first career hat-trick against Warriors FC, which Tanjong Pagar United won 6–1. On 4 October 2013, Zerka scored a hat-trick 2 goals and 1 own goal to helped Tanjong Pagar United become the first team to qualify for the 2013 Singapore Cup.

International career
Zerka has gained 10 full caps for Morocco, scoring 2 goals.

2004 Summer Olympics football tournament
Zerka was a member of the Moroccan squad for the 2004 Summer Olympics football tournament. He was a starter in Morocco's first match, a 0–0 draw against Costa Rica. In the second match, a 1–2 defeat by  Portugal, Zerka was once again a starter, but he was substituted in the 72nd minute by Tajeddine Sami. He watched Morocco's third, and last, match in the tournament from the bench. The match ended up a 2–1 victory for Morocco, its only victory in the tournament. Morocco got 4 points, equal to those of Costa Rica, but it was eliminated from the tournament, as it had scored less goals than Costa Rica.

2008 African Cup of Nations
Zerka also featured in the Morocco squad for the 2008 Africa Cup of Nations in Ghana. In the opening match for Morocco, he came in as a substitute for Youssouf Hadji in the 70th minute. He managed to score a header for Morocco  4 minutes after his entrance in the game. It was his team's last goal in 1-5 devastation against Namibia and Zerka's first goal for the Atlas Lions. He was a starter in his team's next match, a 3–2 defeat by Guinea, but he was substituted in the 80th minute by El Moubarki. In the next match Morocco had to compete against host nation Ghana. Zerka came in as a substitute for Aboucherouane in the 55th minute of the match, but he was unable to help his team overturn Ghana's 2–0 lead. Morocco finished 3rd in its group and was eliminated.

Honours
Nancy
 Ligue 2: 2004–05
 Coupe de la Ligue: 2006

References

External links
 
 
 
 
 Monsef Zerka Interview

1981 births
Living people
Moroccan footballers
Morocco international footballers
French footballers
French sportspeople of Moroccan descent
Association football forwards
AS Nancy Lorraine players
FC Nantes players
Iraklis Thessaloniki F.C. players
New England Revolution players
FC Petrolul Ploiești players
Ligue 1 players
Ligue 2 players
Super League Greece players
Major League Soccer players
Liga I players
Expatriate footballers in Greece
Expatriate soccer players in the United States
Expatriate footballers in Romania
Moroccan expatriate sportspeople in Romania
Footballers at the 2004 Summer Olympics
Olympic footballers of Morocco
2006 Africa Cup of Nations players
2008 Africa Cup of Nations players
Expatriate footballers in Singapore
Tanjong Pagar United FC players
Singapore Premier League players
French expatriate sportspeople in Singapore
French expatriate sportspeople in Romania
French expatriate sportspeople in Greece
French expatriate sportspeople in the United States
Moroccan expatriate sportspeople in Singapore
Moroccan expatriate sportspeople in Greece
Moroccan expatriate sportspeople in the United States
French expatriate footballers